Animal Park is a 1991 children's television series on the Seven Network. The series follows the adventures of three children who rebuild a run-down animal park on the central Queensland coast.

Cast
 Anthony Hayes as Damien Halliday
 Zoe Bertram as Sarah Halliday
 Mark Hembrow as Jim Pryor
 Alyce Platt as Christina Hoffman
 Erin Coombs as Becky Halliday
 Goran Ristovski as Tony Medotti
 Janelle Owen as Jenny Halliday
 Christopher Elliott as Dad

References

External links
Animal Park at IMDb

Australian children's television series
1991 Australian television series debuts
1992 Australian television series endings